Khayla Pointer (born November 25, 1998) is an American professional basketball player for the Indiana Fever of the Women's National Basketball Association (WNBA). She played college basketball at LSU from 2017 to 2022.

College career
Coming out of high school, Pointer was a 4-Star recruit and ranked the 70th overall recruit in ESPN HoopGurlz Ranking. Pointer was the 14th ranked player from Prospect Nation before she made a commitment to play for the LSU Tigers program. When she committed, her aunt Nikki Fargas was the head coach of the team.

During her freshman season, Pointer played in all 29 games for the Tigers, making 2 starts. She averaged 4.4 points, 1.4 rebounds, and 2.2 assists during the year. She scored a season-high in points on January 14, 2017, when LSU played Florida. Pointer scored 17 points on 6-11 shooting , while also grabbing 5 rebounds.

Pointer moved into the starting role during her sophomore season and made a big impact for the Tigers. She increased her minutes per game to 31.7 and her scoring jumped up from the 4.4 her freshman season to 12.5 a game. In her junior season, Pointer once again averaged over 30+ minutes a game and became the team's leading scorer at 14.8 points. She became one of the SEC's best guards as she was Top 10 in many statical categories. Pointer ranked 10th in scoring, 3rd in assists, 5th in steals, 7th in assist/turnover ratio, and 10th in free throw percentage. Pointer was rewarded for her top play and was named to the SEC All-Second Team in 2020.

On December 20, 2022, Pointer scored her 1,000th career point against Loyola Marymount as the Tigers won 54-52. Pointer again had a great statistical year for the Tigers averaging 16.9 points, 4.1 rebounds, 4.1 assists, and was named to the All- SEC 1st Team and the All-Defensive Team.

On April 9, 2021, it was announced that Pointer would return to LSU for her COVID-Extra year to play a 5th year for the Tigers. Later that month, LSU hired Kim Mulkey as their new head coach. Mulkey stated that “She (Pointer) is an all-conference player, and she is a leader out there on the floor,” Mulkey. “She’s learning. It’s a new system for her. She will be one of our leaders as will Faus (Fuastine Aifuwa) and (Jailin) Cherry,” at one of her preseason press conferences.

In her graduate season, Pointer was a finalist for the Nancy Lieberman Point Guard Award. She was named to the All-SEC 1st Team and made the AP and Sports Illustrated All-American 2nd Teams, as well as the USBWA All-American Third Team. She averaged a career best 19.6 points, 6.4 rebounds, and 5.3 assists.

College statistics

Professional career
Pointer was selected by the Las Vegas Aces in the 2nd round of the 2022 WNBA Draft with the 13th overall pick.  Pointer was waived on May 2, 2022, and did not make the Aces' roster.

Indiana Fever
On June 14, 2022, Pointer was signed by the Indiana Fever.

WNBA career statistics

Regular season

|-
| align="left" | 2022
| align="left" | Indiana
| 10 || 0 || 5.8 || .583 || .250 || .500 || 0.8 || 0.2 || 0.2 || 0.0 || 0.9 || 2.2
|-
| align="left" | Career
| align="left" | 1 year, 1 team
| 10 || 0 || 5.8 || .583 || .250 || .500 || 0.8 || 0.2 || 0.2 || 0.0 || 0.9 || 2.2

References

External links
WNBA bio
LSU Tigers bio

1998 births
Living people
American women's basketball players
Basketball players from Georgia (U.S. state)
Guards (basketball)
LSU Lady Tigers basketball players
Las Vegas Aces draft picks
People from Marietta, Georgia